Tu'u Maori (22 November 1988 – 3 January 2022) was a Papua New Guinea international rugby league footballer who played as a er or . He played in the Australian National Youth Championship (Toyota Cup) for the Cronulla Sharks and Sydney Roosters.

Playing career
Maori was named in the Papua New Guinea training squad for the 2008 Rugby League World Cup. He was then named in the PNG squad for the 2008 Rugby League World Cup.

Maori was part of the 2007 Papua New Guinea Tour of Wales and France. He played against Wales on the wing at the Brewery Field, Bridgend, Wales. He represented the Sydney Roosters in the Toyota Cup in 2008. Maori also played for the Newtown Jets, the Roosters' feeder club in the NSWRL Cup competition, in 2009. He was named as part of the Papua New Guinea squad for the 2009 Pacific Cup. He also played for the Cronulla Sharks in the 2011 NSW Cup.

Personal life and death
Maori died from motor neurone disease at his home in Ipswich, Queensland, on 3 January 2022, at the age of 33.

References

External links
Newtown Jets profile

1988 births
2022 deaths
Newtown Jets NSW Cup players
Papua New Guinea national rugby league team players
Papua New Guinean rugby league players
People educated at St Paul's College, Auckland
New Zealand people of Papua New Guinean descent
Rugby league centres
Rugby league five-eighths
Rugby league fullbacks
Rugby league players from Auckland
Neurological disease deaths in Queensland
Deaths from motor neuron disease